Kanchan Gupta (Bengali: কাঞ্চন গুপ্ত) is an Indian journalist, political analyst, and activist.

Early life and education

Born to Bangladeshi refugee parents, Kanchan Gupta was raised in Jamshedpur and Patna where he attended missionary schools. He later moved to Kolkata where he studied English literature, political science and economics at St Xavier’s College, University of Calcutta.

Journalism career
In 1982, he joined The Telegraph as a sub-editor on the news desk, where he learned editing from M.J. Akbar. In 1987, he was invited to join The Statesman by the paper's then-editor, Sunanda K. Datta-Ray. He became the youngest Assistant Editor in The Statesman’s history.

In 1991, he moved to Delhi with a new assignment as Assistant Editor of The Pioneer, then edited by Vinod Mehta. He was promoted to Deputy Editor in 1994.

He took a break from journalism from 1995 to 2004. He returned to journalism in 2004, and again joined The Pioneer for some time, edited by Chandan Mitra.

Kanchan Gupta writes on national and regional politics, international affairs and security issues. His weekly column, Coffee Break, appears in The Pioneer every Sunday. He writes a weekly column for the popular Mumbai daily, MidDay. He participates in Indian television programs on political and national security issues. He is politically conservative, socially liberal. He lives by the precepts of the Brahmo Samaj.

Political career
In December 1995, he gave up full-time journalism to concentrate on a public career and began to assist L.K. Advani and Atal Bihari Vajpayee in their parliamentary work. As an official in the Prime Minister’s Office (PMO) when the NDA came to power, he worked in close association with National Security Advisor Brajesh Mishra on foreign affairs and security issues. He was the PMO’s representative on the National Security Advisory Board.

As part of the Government’s public diplomacy initiative in Arab countries, and to engage and influence opinion-makers and the intelligentsia in the Middle East, Kanchan Gupta was sent to Egypt as director of the Maulana Azad Centre for Indian Culture in Cairo. He held this post till 2004.

In June 2021, Gupta was appointed Senior Advisor at the Ministry of Information and Broadcasting.

References

External links

Kanchan Gupta's Personal Blog - Agent Provocateur

Living people
Year of birth missing (living people)
Bengali Hindus
20th-century Bengalis
21st-century Bengalis
Brahmos
Indian journalists
Indian newspaper journalists
20th-century Indian journalists
21st-century Indian journalists
Indian male journalists
Indian columnists
Indian bloggers
University of Calcutta alumni
Writers from Patna
Male bloggers
Journalists from West Bengal
Indian political writers
Indian editors
Indian activists
Indian political journalists
Indian opinion journalists
Indian foreign policy writers
Scholars of Indian foreign policy